The 1892 Thirsk rail crash happened at Manor House signal box on 2 November 1892, on the North Eastern Railway about  north of Thirsk railway station in the North Riding of Yorkshire, England.

Events
James Holmes was the signalman at Manor House signal box. The day before the crash, his infant daughter Rose was taken ill and later died. Holmes had been awake for over 36 hours and was extremely distressed, having ministered to the child, walked miles to try and find the local doctor (who was away from home attending to another patient) and comforted his distraught wife. He reported to the stationmaster at Otterington, Thomas Kirby, that he would be unable to work the shift on the next night, but Kirby merely asked his superiors for a relief signalman, without stating that the reason was that Holmes had reported himself unfit to work. The Assistant District Signals Inspector at York, already harassed by other emergencies, replied that there was no relief signalman available, and his superior later concurred.

Forced to complete his shift, Holmes called at the Otterington signal box before walking to Manor House and asked the signalman there, Henry Eden, to notify him when the passenger train from York arrived at 8:58 pm; Holmes was expecting his mother to arrive by that service, having telegraphed asking for her to come and tend to his wife as he worked. He had expected his mother to arrive on either the 6:00 pm or 7:37 pm trains, and had walked to the station on both occasions hoping to meet her. He also told the Otterington signalman that he was already exhausted.

It was night with a thick mist which later thickened to fog. About three hours into Holmes' shift, by which time he had received a telegraph stating that his mother had arrived on the 8:58 pm train and gone straight to his house, two express passenger trains were due from the north. These constituted the up night Scotch Express, which was divided into two separate trains. The first had left Edinburgh on time at 10:30 pm, but the second had been delayed by the late arrival of connecting trains and did not leave until 11:02 pm. After the first portion of the express had passed Northallerton North the signalman there allowed a goods train from Middlesbrough to Starbeck up the main line after it. Holmes let the goods train into his section but then was "overmastered by sleep". The goods train came to a halt just outside his signal box. Thirteen minutes later, Holmes awoke, rather confused. The Otterington signalman warned him to be ready for the second part of the express, and Holmes saw that his instruments still indicated that there was a train on the line. He had forgotten about the goods train, and thought he had fallen asleep before clearing the instruments after the first express. He cleared the instruments and accepted the second express. He then had second thoughts and telegraphed the Otterington signal box (using the "speaking instrument", an old term for the single needle telegraph, not to be confused with a telephone), but too late for the Otterington signalman to halt the express.

The express crashed at sixty miles per hour into the goods train, which had only just started to move off at walking pace. Nine passengers and the guard of the goods train were killed. 39 other passengers and 4 train crew injured. Nearly an hour later, hot coals from the firebox of the engine of the express train set the wreckage on fire. The express train's Pintsch oil gas lighting system acted as an accelerant and added to the fire. Two of the bodies were incinerated and were not recovered. Men employed to clear the crash site and repair the permanent way reported finding calcined bones and lumps of flesh. Some of the human remains had coins fused to them from the intense heat of the fire. The bodies that could be recovered were moved to Thirsk station and an inquest was opened immediately so that the bodies could be released to the families.

Aftermath
Holmes was charged with manslaughter and found guilty, but was given an absolute discharge upon the strong recommendation of the jury, who were sympathetic to Holmes' personal tragedy; public opinion was also in Holmes' favour.

The railway company was strongly criticised for its cavalier treatment of Holmes, and there had been contributory negligence; by the Otterington signalman who knew of Holmes' condition and took no action when there was silence from his signal box for nearly a quarter of an hour, and by the crew of the goods train who remained halted outside Holmes' signal box for several minutes without sending a crewman to the signal box in accordance with Rule 55 to ensure that their train was properly protected by the signals and block instruments.

Prevention
The accident would have been prevented if the line had been fitted with track circuits which would have prevented the block instruments and the signals from being cleared. However, at the time track circuits were relatively new. Although Manor House was a heavily used part of what was to become known as the East Coast Main Line, the need for such aids to safety there would have been regarded as low; there were no junctions, sidings or crossovers to confuse movement, and the block was one of the shortest and straightest in the country.

Board of Trade Inspecting Officer Francis Marindin also noted that the many casualties were as a result of the lighter carriages being marshalled between the engine and the heavier Pullman coach behind them. When the crash occurred, the Pullman carriage tore into the lighter carriages at the front of the train.

Similar accidents
 Clayton Tunnel rail crash – signalman gets confused about which train is which – 1861
 Hawes Junction train disaster – signalman forgets about light engines on line – 1910
 Quintinshill rail crash – signalman forgets about train on line – 1915
 Winwick rail crash – signalman and booking boy forget about train on main line. (1934)

See also
 List of British rail accidents

References

Sources

RailwaysArchive.co.uk summary

Further reading

Railway accidents and incidents in Yorkshire
Railway accidents in 1892
1892 in England
History of North Yorkshire
Rail transport in North Yorkshire
Transport disasters in Yorkshire
19th century in Yorkshire
Train collisions in England
Railway accidents involving fog
Accidents and incidents involving North Eastern Railway (UK)
Railway accidents caused by signaller's error
Thirsk
1892 disasters in the United Kingdom